Day Is Longer Than Night is a 1984 Georgian drama film directed by Lana Gogoberidze. It was entered into the 1984 Cannes Film Festival.

Plot
The film tells the story of a woman's difficult fate. For eighty years Eva spent her life in a Georgian mountain village. There she married Georgiy the shepherd, who soon died, possibly murdered. After this she married Spyridon out of compassion for his lonesome, gloomy lost soul. In her native village Eva lived through the revolution and civil war, the NEP and the collectivization.

And now Eva lives in a deserted village. Most of the villagers move to the city where living is simpler and easier and life is always seething. And even  the mother of Eva's beloved grandson who has come from the city, wants to take him away with her. But the boy remains with his grandmother who believes that the village where their ancestors lived will be reborn.

Cast
 Daredjan Kharshiladze as young Eva
 Tamara Skhirtladze as old Eva
 Guram Pirtskhalava as Spyridon, Eva's husband
 Irakli Khizanishvili as Archil, professional revolutionary
 Guram Palavandishvili as Georgiy the shepherd, Eva's husband
 Leo Pilpani as Eva's father
 Akaki Khidasheli as Mnate
 Guranda Gabunia as Daredzhan, Spyridon's daughter
 Sofiko Arsenishvili as Daredzhan in childhood
 Nika Khazaradze as Georgiy, Daredzhan's young son
 Grigol Talakvadze as Mito, fellow villager
 Natia Gogochuri as "puritan", prostitute

References

External links

1984 films
Georgian-language films
1984 drama films
Films directed by Lana Gogoberidze
Soviet-era films from Georgia (country)
Drama films from Georgia (country)